The Quest 2 is a virtual reality (VR) headset developed by Reality Labs, a division of Facebook, Inc. (now Meta Platforms). It was unveiled on September 16, 2020, and released on October 13 as the Oculus Quest 2. It was then rebranded as the Meta Quest 2 in 2022, as part of a company-wide phase-out of the Oculus brand after the rebranding of Facebook, Inc. as Meta.  

It is a refresh of the original Oculus Quest with a similar design, but with a lighter weight, updated internal specifications, a display with a higher refresh rate and per-eye resolution, and updated Oculus Touch controllers with improved battery life. As with its predecessor, the Quest 2 can run as either a standalone headset with an internal, Android-based operating system, or with Oculus Rift-compatible VR software running on a desktop computer.

The Quest 2 received mostly positive reviews as an incremental update to the Quest, but some of its changes faced criticism, including its stock head strap, reduced interpupillary distance (IPD) options, and a new requirement for users to log in with a Facebook account to use the headset and Oculus services.

Specifications

Hardware 
Its design is similar to the original Oculus Quest, but replacing the black, cloth-covered exterior with white-colored plastic and a black face 
pad. It is lighter than the first-generation Quest, at 503 grams (17.7 ounces) in comparison to 571 grams (20.1 ounces). The strap was changed to a fabric-based version, rather than the elastic-based strap of the Quest. 

The Quest 2 uses the Qualcomm Snapdragon XR2 SoC, a derivative of the Snapdragon 865 designed for VR and augmented reality devices. It includes 6 GB of LPDDR4X RAM — an increase of 2 GB over the first-generation model.

The dual OLED displays of the first-generation Quest were replaced by a singular, fast-switch LCD panel with a per-eye resolution of 1832×1920, and a refresh rate of up to 120 Hz (an increase from 1440×1600 per-eye at 72 Hz). The display uses striped subpixels rather than a PenTile matrix; this arrangement improves image clarity by reducing the screen-door effect. At launch, the display's refresh rate was locked at 72 Hz via software, with 90 Hz mode as an experimental option limited to the home area only. A software update in November 2020 enabled games to run in 90 Hz mode. In April 2021, an update further added experimental support for 120 Hz mode in games.

The headset supports physical interpupillary distance (IPD) adjustment at 58 mm, 63 mm and 68 mm, adjusted by physically moving the lenses into each position.

Software 

The Quest 2 runs an Android-based operating system. To conduct first-time setup, a smartphone running the Meta Quest app must be used. 

An update in February 2021 added support for up to three additional accounts to be logged into a single Quest 2 headset, with the ability for accounts to share purchased software between them. In April 2021, a software update added "Air Link" as an experimental feature, which allows games to be streamed from a PC over Wi-Fi. In July 2021, experimental APIs were added to the Passthrough feature to allow for augmented reality features.

Controllers 

The included controllers with the Quest 2 are the third generation Oculus Touch controllers. The design of the new controllers was influenced by the original Oculus Rift controllers. Their battery life has also been increased four-fold over the controllers included with the first-generation Quest.

Games 

Quest 2 supports all games and software made for the first-generation model, and existing titles can be updated to support higher graphical quality on Quest 2. It also supports Quest Link (USB) and Air Link (Wi-Fi), which allows the headset to be used with Oculus Rift-compatible software on a PC. It is not backwards compatible with Oculus Go apps and games.

Release 
The Quest 2 was first released in two SKUs differentiated by storage capacity, with a 64 GB model priced at US$299, and a 256 GB model (replacing the original Quest's 128 GB model) priced at $399. Both are a US$100 decrease over their equivalent SKUs on the first-generation model. In 2021, the 64 GB model of the Quest 2 was replaced by a 128 GB model at the same price point.

In November 2021, as part of the rebranding of Facebook, Inc. as Meta, the Oculus brand began to be phased out; the Oculus Quest 2 began to be referred to "Meta Quest 2" in promotional materials, Oculus Store was rebranded as "Quest Store", and Oculus-developed community platforms (such as Facebook Horizon) took on the "Horizon" brand. As of 2022, newer production runs of the Quest 2 hardware now carry the "Meta Quest 2" branding, with the Oculus logo replaced with that of Meta. The branding took effect at the OS level in March 2022, as part of system software version 38. 

Meta aired a commercial for the Quest 2 and Horizon Worlds, "Old Friends, New Fun", during Super Bowl LVI in February 2022.

In July 2022, citing increased production costs and to "enable us to continue investing in ways that will keep driving this increasingly competitive industry forward for consumers and developers alike", it was announced that the prices of all current Meta Quest 2 SKUs would be increased by US$100 beginning in August 2022. It was concurrently announced that Beat Saber would also be bundled with the headset through the end of the year as a promotional offer.

Accessories 
Facebook presented an "Elite Strap" accessory, which contains a ring-like pad for the back of the head and a tightness dial, along with a variant with a battery pack built into the strap. Facebook also promoted Logitech headphones "certified" for Quest 2, including the G333 VR—the company's first in-ear headphones—which have shortened cables designed for use with VR headsets.

In addition, Facebook partnered with Logitech to support their K830 keyboard as part of the "Infinite Office" feature, allowing the keyboard to be detected and displayed within a virtual reality environment.

In October 2022, Meta unveiled new Touch Pro controllers for the Meta Quest Pro, which are also available as an optional accessory for existing Quest 2 headsets. These controllers have a more compact design, replace the infrared tracking rings with cameras for on-board inside-out tracking (thus no longer needing to be within the line of sight of the headset's cameras for best performance), and also include a pressure sensor for pinching gestures, and rechargeable batteries.

Reception 
The Verge was positive in a pre-release review, noting that while it lacked standout features, it did have "worthwhile" improvements such as reduced weight, a screen with a better visual appearance and refresh rate than the original Quest, and a re-located USB port. The new strap was panned for having "less support and a slightly clumsier tightening mechanism" (partly rectified by the Elite Strap accessory sold separately), and the new IPD mechanism was considered "annoying" and not as inclusive as that of the first-generation model. In conclusion, it was argued that while it was not a "must-upgrade" for existing owners, the Quest 2 had "the best overall balance of hardware, features, and price."

Ars Technica was less positive, noting that its internal speakers were "noticeably crisper and louder", but panning the new cloth strap in comparison to the original Quest's elastic straps (and arguing that it alone was responsible for the claimed reduction in weight), the limited IPD options, worse battery life, and the controllers having less grip and reduced accuracy on more intensive games. The switch from OLED to LCD was shown to produce "crisper" images but more "washed out" color.

The Elite Strap accessory was met with criticism initially due to issues with the straps breaking randomly. In response, Facebook stated that the issue was a "processing inconsistency" affecting only a few units, and sales of the strap were paused temporarily before going on sale again. Other issues, such as loose screws in the strap were also reported.

Sales 
In November 2021, Qualcomm stated that at least 10 million Quest 2 headsets had been shipped worldwide. In late-December 2021, the Oculus app (which is required to complete first-time setup) became the most popular app on the iOS App Store and Google Play Store in the United States for the first time—implying that Quest headsets had been heavily purchased as Christmas gifts during the holiday shopping season.

Facebook integration 
The Quest 2 has faced criticism over the mandate that users must log in with a Facebook account in order to use the Quest 2 and any future Oculus products, including the amount of user data that could be collected by the company via virtual reality hardware and interactions, such as the user's surroundings, motions and actions, and biometrics. It was reported that some users were unable to use the headset due to their Facebook account being suspended. Some described that linking their deactivated Facebook account to the device rendered the headset a "paperweight". In September 2020, Facebook suspended the sale of all Oculus products in Germany after it faced criticism from the German Federal Cartel Office over the requirement. At the Facebook Connect event in 2021, Mark Zuckerberg stated that the company was "working on making it so you can log in into Quest with an account other than your personal Facebook account". 

Meta later announced in July 2022 that it would establish a new "Meta account" platform, which will not be explicitly tied to the Facebook social network, and that users who transition to Meta account would be allowed to decouple their Facebook logins from its VR platforms. However, Ars Technica noted that the new terms of service and privacy policies associated with the new Meta account system could still allow enforcement of a real name policy (stating that users would be obligated to provide "accurate and up to date information (including registration information), which may include providing personal data", and still allowed for "rampant" use of user data by Meta.

Face pad recall 
In December 2020, Facebook stated that it was investigating reports of users experiencing rashes and other skin irritation from the Quest 2's foam face pad. In April 2021, Facebook stated that it had identified and reduced the use of "a few trace substances that are normally present in the manufacturing process which could contribute to skin discomfort", but that they "did not find any contamination or unexpected substances in our manufacturing process." On July 27, 2021, Facebook announced that it had issued a recall of the face pads in Canada and the United States, would issue free silicone covers to existing users, and would temporarily suspend global sales of the Quest 2 in order to allow these covers to be included with all future shipments of the headset.

References

External links 
 
 Meta Quest 2 on VRcompare

Meta Quest
Products introduced in 2020
Virtual reality headsets
Wearable devices
Metaverse